Bulletin of the Natural History Museum, formerly known as Bulletin of the British Museum (Natural History) is a series of scientific journals published by the British Museum, and later by the Natural History Museum of London. Titles in the series included

Bulletin of the British Museum (Natural History), Botany Series
Bulletin of the British Museum (Natural History), Entomology Series
Bulletin of the British Museum (Natural History), Geology Series
Bulletin of the British Museum (Natural History), Historical Series
Bulletin of the British Museum (Natural History), Mineralogy Series
Bulletin of the British Museum (Natural History), Zoology Series
Upon transfer to the Natural History Museum, the journals were known as
Bulletin of the Natural History Museum, Botany Series
Bulletin of the Natural History Museum, Entomology Series 
Bulletin of the Natural History Museum, Historical Series
Bulletin of the Natural History Museum, Geology Series (which included the former Mineralogy series)
Bulletin of the Natural History Museum, Zoology Series

The Botany, Entomology and Zoology series merged to form Systematics and Biodiversity, while the Geology series was succeeded by the Journal of Systematic Palaeontology.

Biology journals
Entomology journals and magazines
Geology journals
Zoology journals
Multidisciplinary scientific journals